Okribites is a perisphinctoidean  ammonite from the middle Jurassic of the Republic of Georgia. It is assigned to the family Parkinsoniidae, a group of strongly but evenly ribbed evolute, commonly discoidal ammonites. Parkinsonia is a related genus.

References

 W.J. Arkell et al., 1957. Mesozoic Ammonoidea; Treatise on Invertebrate Paleongology, Part L, Ammonoidea.

Jurassic ammonites
Jurassic animals of Asia
Ammonitida genera
Perisphinctoidea